Chandralekha is a 2014 Indian Tamil-language soap opera airing on Sun TV. The show premiered on 6 October 2014 and ended on 8 October 2022. It starred Shwetha Bandekar, Naagasri GS and Sandhya Jagarlamudi. It became the First longest ran Tamil soap opera, after crossing 2315 episodes on its final day of airing.

Plot  
Meena and Vasundhara are long-lost sisters where Meena was abandoned from her parents from when she's a child. Meena give birth to Lekha and Vasundhara give birth to Chandra. After some kidnappers came to the hospital, the babies switched where Meena raised Chandra and Vasundhara raised Lekha. Chandra is benevolent and brave while Lekha is cunning and arrogant, like her adoptive mother. Meena only knows that Chandra and Lekha were switched at birth. Events later show that Meena is the adopted sister of Lekha's adopted father Ashok.

Enter Sabari, an innocent man who runs a non income matrimony. Meena fixed a man for Chandra's marriage from the matrimony where Chandra and Sabari meet and fall in love with each other without expressing it. Lekha, who sees Sabari, starts to love him too. Vasundhara who wants to take revenge on Chandra who attacked her while her journalism encounter and Meena for being her most praised sister-in-law, arranged an accused convict, Vignesh to marry Chandra. Despite loving Sabari, Chandra agrees to marry Chandra because Meena and Selvam (Chandra's adopted father) believe she will accept their offer.

Vignesh murdered Nandhini, a girl who he impregnated and wants to marry Chandra by acting like a nice person. Siddharth is a police officer who is searching for the accused, who is Vignesh, befriends Chandra and finds out Vignesh is the accused. On the wedding day of Chandra and Vignesh, Chandra arrested him with help of Siddharth and the marriage was stopped. Vasundhara was very happy but Meena who was worried, really wanted her daughter to marry. They choose Sabari who is a really good choice for Chandra. Sabari and Chandra were really happy of getting married and they ready for the marriage but Lekha ends up blackmailing them saying that she will commit suicide. Chandra makes Lekha the bride and informs Sabari to marry her for her wish and Meena is happy for this forgetting about Chandra's life. Vasundhara is angry that her daughter married a poor man.

Sabari starts to live with Lekha and they settle at Vasundhara's house where Lekha is pregnant but she aborted it to always be young which makes Sabari angry but he unites with her. Lekha keeps blackmailing Sabari, knowing of his love for Chandra. Chandra met a kind-hearted rich man, Sanjay, who loves Chandra at first sight. Chandra and Sanjay fall in love with each other. Their parents arranged their marriage. In this time, Siddharth's daughter Abhi was kidnapped by his father in law (Mangai's father) to get Mangai's property. To avoid this and get Abhi, Siddharth should marry but a woman who loved him, Jeeva went to the hospital due to her cancer. So Chandra registered for Siddharth but they divorced and Jeeva and Siddharth married instead. Chandra and Sanjay marry with family blessings and love. Here enters Nila, Chandra's replica. Nila married her cousin Thiru with the help of Chandra and Sanjay.

Lekha reforms, and turns into a more positive woman after Sabari has an affair with Saranya, Lekha's enemy. Lekha and Sabari reunite with the assistance of Chandra and Brindha aka Bhavani. Bhavani is a nurse Brindha who lost her sister and took revenge for her. She married Surya, a mentally problematic man but a rich man. She takes a vow to cure him to his evil stepmother and help him break free from her. Chandra takes vow to settle down Sanjay cousin Devi's life to Meenatchi. Lekha takes a vow that she will win her life from poverty to Saranya. The story now is how Chandra, Lekha and Brindha will settle their problem with the antagonists.

Cast

Main
 Shwetha Bandekar as Chandra Sanjay
 she also played the character as Nila Thiruvasagan
 Nagasree GS as Lekha Sabarinathan
 Sandhya Jagarlamudi as Brindha alais Bhavani Surya

Recurring
 Jai Dhanush as Sanjay (2014-2019 and 2021–present)
 Munaf Rahman as Sanjay (2020-2021)
 Arun Kumar Rajan replacement Ashwin Kumar as Sabarinathan "Sabari"
 Pandi Kamal as Surya Karunakaran
 Vanitha Hariharan replacement Harshala Honey as Sridevi "Devi"
 Kannan Balachandran as Krishnamoorthy "Krishna"
 Gopi as Ranjith Karunakaran 
 Geetha  Narayanan as Kalavathi
 Premi Venkat replacement Shanthi Anandraj as Radha Parandhaman
 Ramesh as Parandhaman 
 Geetha replacement Kousalya Senthamarai as Surya and Ranjith's grandmother 
 Sangeetha Balan as Maragatham 
 Meenakumari as Meena
 Rishi Keshav as Selvam
 Saakshi Siva as Ashok Kumar
 Sumangali as Thangam
 Bhuvaneshwari replacement Niharika replacement Dr. Sharmila as Vasundhara Devi
 Shravan Rajesh as Inspector Siddarth
 Baby Athina as Abirami
 Krithika Laddu as Jeevadarani Siddharth a.k.a. "Jeeva"
 Maanas Chavali as Vignesh 
 Mahesh Prabha as Inspector Sethupathy
 Divya Padmini as Mangaiyakarasi Siddarth a.k.a. "Mangai"
 Keerthi Jai Dhanush as Rudhradevi
 Nimesh Sagar as Thiruvasagan "Thiru"
 Supergood Kannan as Sundaram
 Ujjayinee Roy as Chintamani
 Dharini as Bhairavi
 Vijay Krishnaraj replacement Sai Gopi as Manickam (Dead)
 Dev Anand Sharma as Haasan 
 Lakshmi Raj as Sendhooran 
 Gowthami Vembunathan as Mohana Valli 
 Gve Krishna as Varun
 Mukesh Kanna as Vicky 
 Surekha as Lakshmi
 Suresh Krishnamurti as Rajashekar
 Vimal Raj as Thambi Anne
 Varun Mithra as Karthick
 Dubbing Janaki as Abirami Ramanathan
 Thyagarajan as Ramanathan
 Mahesh Subramaniam as Sriram
 Rekha Suresh as Mrs Vinodhan
 Malavika as Jhansi (Dead)
 Ravivarma as Jeeva's uncle
 Usha Elizabeth as Latha
 Bharathi Mohan as Anbarasu
 Shree Padma as Lavanya Anbarasu
 Isaac Varghese as Kathir
 S. Sunil Kumar as Vinodan
 Birla Bose as Ganesh
 K. S. Jayalakshmi as Tamilarasi Varadhachari
 Sairam as Varadhachari
 Devipriya as Fake Brinda Sarathi
 Vaani as Nila's adopted Grandmother
 J. Lalitha as Deivanai 
 Ram as Sivanaandi
 Aravind as Rajesh (Dead)
 Nisha Jagadeeswaran as Anjali
 Sujatha as Renuka
 Shyam as Vinod
 Sabana Parvin as Divya Vinod
 Jothika as Aishwarya
 Pavithran as Arun
 Navindhar as Sundar
 Chandhini Prakash as Priyanka
 Ilayavan as Prathibha
 Chitra Lakshmanan as Gemini Ganesan
 Nalini as Arivu Azhagi
 Sunitha as Saranya 
 Shanthi Williams replacement Priya as Meenakshi 
 Rani as ACP Chandrakantha

Special appearances
 Sibbu Suryan as Advocate Arjun Prathap
 Priyanka Nalkari as Roja Arjun 
 Vanitha Vijayakumar as Herself

Soundtrack
Title song of the show was written by lyricist V.Saravana Raja, composed by the music director X.Paulraj. It was sung by Anuradha Sriram.

References

External links
 Official Website 

Sun TV original programming
Tamil-language thriller television series
2014 Tamil-language television series debuts
2010s Tamil-language television series
Tamil-language television shows
Television shows set in Tamil Nadu
2022 Tamil-language television series endings